Amour fou is a 1993 French TV movie written and directed by Roger Vadim and starring Marie-Christine Barrault.

Cast
Marie-Christine Barrault as Louise
Andrea Occhipinti as Sacha
Henri Virlogeux  as Father Lefebvre
Laetitla Legrix as Amelie
Daniel Briquet as Inspector
Claude Crule as D'Estremont
Edith Brunner as Ema
Sylvia Galmot
Adrien Lacassaigne as Gendarme
Jean-Michel Leray as Pierre
Pierre Mezerette as Edouard
Jean-Pierre Brigadier as Rochette

External links
Amour fou at IMDb
Amour fou at TCMDB

French television films
1993 television films
1990s French films